Jujubinus pseudogravinae is a species of sea snail, a marine gastropod mollusk in the family Trochidae, the top snails.

This species is considered by some as a synonym of Jujubinus gravinae gravinae (Dautzenberg, Ph., 1881)

Description
The size of the shell varies between 3 mm and 7.5 mm.

Distribution
This species occurs in the Atlantic Ocean off the Azores.

References

 Nordsieck F. (1973). Il genere Jujubinus Monterosato, 1884 in Europa. La Conchiglia 50: 6–7, 11-12
 Avila S.P., Borges J.P. & Frias Martins A.M. de (2011) The littoral Trochoidea (Mollusca: Gastropoda) of the Azores. Journal of Conchology 40(4): 408–427.
page(s): 409

External links
 Gastropods.com: Jujubinus gravinae gravinae

pseudogravinae
Gastropods described in 1973
Molluscs of the Azores